Chahak (also Romanized as Chāhak) is a village in Tabas Rural District, in the Central District of Khoshab County, Razavi Khorasan Province, Iran. At the 2006 census, its population was 347, in 107 families.

References 

Populated places in Khoshab County